Jocelyne Bourgon,  (born September 20, 1950) is a former Canadian public servant. She was the first woman appointed as the Clerk of the Privy Council, serving from 1994 until 1999.

Life and career
Born in Papineauville, Quebec, she studied in science (Biology) at the University of Montreal and then management at the University of Ottawa. She joined the public service of Canada as a summer student with the Department of Transport in 1974. She was rapidly promoted to the level of Deputy Minister. She served in several Departments including Consumer and Corporate Affairs (Industry), Cabinet Secretary for Federal-Provincial Relations, President of Canadian International Development Agency (CIDA), and Transport Canada.

As Deputy Minister she led major legislative reforms; organized a First Ministers Conference on Canada-USA free trade negotiations; led the Constitutional negotiations; and prepared a major reform leading to the privatization of rail and airports.

Clerk of the Privy Council
In 1994, she was appointed Clerk of the Privy Council  and Secretary to the Canadian Cabinet becoming the first woman to exercise these functions in Canada. To date, woman has exercised an equivalent position (Secretary General of the Government) in any of the other G-7 countries. In this capacity she led some of the most ambitious public sector reforms in Canada since the early 1940s. She oversaw the reduction of the public service by 47,000 positions and introduced measures to enhance the policy capacity and the renewal of the Public Service (La Releve).

Later career
Bourgon served as President of the Canadian Centre for Management Development from 1999 to 2003 leading to the creation of the Canada School of Public Service where she was named  President emeritus. She served as Ambassador to the OECD until 2007. She was a Distinguished Fellow at The Centre for International Governance Innovation (CIGI) and visiting professor at the University of Waterloo where she is conducting several research projects to advance good  governance and the field of public administration. She is advising several countries about public service reforms, most recently France, UK, Ireland, Brazil etc.

She is an active international speaker, participating in various International events, conferences to advance public service reforms, most recently at the OECD, Brazil (World Bank ), IPAA(Dublin), IPA(Sydney), London School of Economics(LSE), Institute for Government ( London), In etc. Her keynotes and lectures are frequently published.

She is active on various international boards and committees including President of CEPA at the UN,  former President of CAPAM,  Board member UK Civil Service College. Institute of government, Singapore Civil Service College etc.

She is the leader of the New Synthesis Project. This project aspires to transform the way people think about the role of government in a post-industrial era. She is also the author of A New Synthesis of Public Administration: Serving in the 21st Century.

Member of the Board of the Industrial Alliance Financial Group since 2014,  she became Chair of the Board in May 2017, the first woman to occupy this position in the 125 years history of the company.(see IS press release)

Awards
She received numerous awards and recognition including the Order of Canada, the Outstanding Achievement Award, six Honorary degrees from Canadian universities.  In recognition of her contribution to her country she was summoned as member of the Queen Privy Council and granted the title of Honourable.

References

Living people
Ambassadors of Canada to the Organisation for Economic Co-operation and Development
Canadian women ambassadors
Clerks of the Privy Council (Canada)
Members of the King's Privy Council for Canada
Officers of the Order of Canada
Université de Montréal alumni
University of Ottawa alumni
1950 births